The Combined Nationalities rugby league team was originally created to play international fixture(s) against France during the 1950s. The team comprised European-based (or in the case of the United States players, European touring) non-French rugby league footballers.

Matches

1950s
During the 1950s, there was Combined Nationalities' 15-19 defeat by France during the 1953–54 season at Stade de Gerland, Lyon, on Sunday 3 January 1954.

Players
Notable players include;
Billy Banks 
Lionel Cooper 
Gerry Helme 
Bob Lampshire  
Tom McKinney 
Keith McLellan 
Bernard McNally 
Owen Phillips 
Willie Richardson  
Leon Sellers right- 
Dave Valentine 
Giovanni Vigna 
Ernest Ward

Combined Nations All Stars
In 2021 the concept was resurrected and an inauguration fixture was played between the, now-named, Combined Nations All Stars and England at the Halliwell Jones Stadium, Warrington on 25 Jun 2021, as part of England’s 2021 Rugby League World Cup preparation. The result was a victory for Combined Nations All Stars 26–24.

References

Combined Nationalities rugby league team
National rugby league teams
Rugby league in Australia
Rugby league in England
Rugby league in Ireland
Rugby league in Italy
Rugby league in Scotland
Rugby league in the United States
Rugby league in Wales